The 2012–13 Big East Conference men's basketball season began with practices in October 2012 and ended with the 2013 Big East men's basketball tournament at Madison Square Garden March 12–16, 2013 in Manhattan, New York. The regular season began in November, with the conference schedule starting on December 31, 2012. 2012-13 marked the 34th year of the Big East, and the 2013 men's basketball Championship marked the 31st anniversary of the Big East at Madison Square Garden, the longest-running conference tournament at one venue in the country. With West Virginia now in the Big 12, the 2012-13 Big East Conference schedule included 4 repeat games.

UConn was ineligible for postseason tournament participation due to low APR scores, The Huskies were also ineligible for the 2013 Big East tournament; the school unsuccessfully appealed the ruling.

The 2012–13 season was the last for the Big East in its original form. In December 2012, the seven Big East schools that do not sponsor Division I FBS football—DePaul, Georgetown, Marquette, Providence, St. John's, Seton Hall, and Villanova, collectively called the "Catholic 7"—announced they would leave the Big East to start a new conference of their own. On March 8, 2013, the "Catholic 7" and the remaining Big East schools announced a separation agreement. Under the agreement, the "Catholic 7" purchased the Big East name and the contract with Madison Square Garden for the conference tournament, and began operating under the Big East name beginning on July 1, 2013. The remaining schools, which kept the charter of the original Big East, announced on April 3 that they would operate as the American Athletic Conference (The American). This was also the final season for Notre Dame, Pittsburgh, and Syracuse, all of which left for the ACC on July 1, 2013. On the same day, SMU, UCF, Memphis, Houston, and Temple became full members of The American.

Preseason

Coaching changes
Jim Calhoun of Connecticut announced his retirement on September 13, 2012. Kevin Ollie, an assistant under Calhoun for the previous two years, was named Calhoun's successor.

Predicted Big East results
At Big East media day on October 17, the conference released their predictions for standings and All-Big East teams.

first place votes

2012-13 Preseason All-Big East Teams

Big East Preseason Player of the Year: Peyton Siva, Louisville
Big East Preseason Rookie of the Year: Steven Adams, Pittsburgh

Preseason Watchlists

Regular season

Head coaches
Mick Cronin, Cincinnati
Kevin Ollie, Connecticut
Oliver Purnell, DePaul
John Thompson III, Georgtown
Rick Pitino, Louisville
Buzz Williams, Marquette
Mike Brey, Notre Dame
Jamie Dixon, Pittsburgh
Ed Cooley, Providence
Mike Rice, Rutgers
Steve Lavin, St. John's
Kevin Willard, Seton Hall
Stan Heath, South Florida
Jim Boeheim, Syracuse
Jay Wright, Villanova

Composite matrix
This table summarizes the head-to-head results between teams in conference play. (x) indicates games scheduled this season.

As of completion of games on March 6th

Rankings

Weekly honors
Throughout the conference regular season, the Big East names a player of the week and rookie of the week each Monday.

Postseason

Big East tournament

  March 12–16, 2013– Big East Conference Basketball Tournament, Madison Square Garden, Manhattan, NY.

NCAA tournament

National Invitation tournament

Awards and honors

Conference awards and teams 
The Player of the Year, Coach of the Year, Rookie of the Year, and Scholar Athlete of the Year awards are  announced, after the conclusion of the first session of the Big East tournament. The remainder of the individual awards are announced at the conclusion of the regular season.

National awards and teams

Players

Award finalists

NBA Draft
Several players from the conference declared early for the NBA draft. Several players were among the 60 players invited to the 2013 NBA Draft Combine.

The following list includes all Big East players who were drafted in the 2013 NBA draft.

See also 
 2012–13 NCAA Division I men's basketball season
 2012–13 Cincinnati Bearcats men's basketball team
 2012–13 Connecticut Huskies men's basketball team
 2012–13 DePaul Blue Demons men's basketball team
 2012–13 Georgetown Hoyas men's basketball team
 2012–13 Louisville Cardinals men's basketball team
 2012–13 Marquette Golden Eagles men's basketball team
 2012–13 Notre Dame Fighting Irish men's basketball team
 2012–13 Pittsburgh Panthers men's basketball team
 2012–13 Providence Friars men's basketball team
 2012–13 Rutgers Scarlet Knights men's basketball team
 2012–13 Seton Hall Pirates men's basketball team
 2012–13 St. John's Red Storm men's basketball team
 2012–13 South Florida Bulls men's basketball team
 2012–13 Syracuse Orange men's basketball team
 2012–13 Villanova Wildcats men's basketball team

References

See also
2012-13 NCAA Division I men's basketball season